Andre Schmid (born April 5, 1983) is a former American soccer player.

Career
Schmid attended Christian Brothers High School in California where he was an ADIDAS high school All American. He then attended St. John's University in New York where he played soccer from 2001 to 2005.  He lost most of the 2003 season to a foot injury which led him to coming back in 2005 for a fifth season with the Redmen.  In January 2006, the Houston Dynamo picked Schmid in the third round (32nd overall) in the 2006 MLS SuperDraft. He never played for the Dynamo first team. Later in 2006, Schmid played for the New York Red Bulls reserve team.  On March 27, 2007, he signed with Seattle Sounders of the USL First Division where he played eighteen games in his first season.

Schmid earned four caps with the United States U-18 national team in 2002.

Honors

Seattle Sounders
USL First Division Championship (1): 2007
USL First Division Commissioner's Cup (1): 2007

References

External links
 Sounders player profile

1983 births
Living people
American soccer players
St. John's Red Storm men's soccer players
Brooklyn Knights players
Houston Dynamo FC players
Seattle Sounders (1994–2008) players
USL League Two players
USL First Division players
United States men's youth international soccer players
Houston Dynamo FC draft picks
Soccer players from California
Association football forwards